Acianthera amaralii is a species of orchid plant native to Brazil.

References 

amaralii
Flora of Brazil
Plants described in 1976